Barbara Jean Kirkmeyer (born September 15, 1958) is an American politician serving as a member of the Colorado Senate for District 23, which encompasses parts of Weld and Larimer counties in north-central Colorado. She was the Republican nominee for Colorado's 8th congressional district in the 2022 election.

Early life and education 
Kirkmeyer is a fourth-generation Coloradoan and has lived in Weld County for 35 years. She earned a Bachelor of Science degree in physical education from the University of Colorado Boulder in 1980.

Career
Kirkmeyer served for a total of 19 years as a County Commissioner for Weld County, Colorado, having been elected and re-elected five times. Representing the third district, she served from 1993 to 2000 and again from 2009 to 2020. In the interim, Kirkmeyer served as acting director of the Colorado Department of Local Affairs under Colorado Governor Bill Owens. In addition, she has served on several boards and commissions, including the Fort Lupton Urban Renewal Authority Board and the Dacono Urban Renewal Authority Board.

In the 2020 Republican primary election for Colorado's 23rd Senate district, Kirkmeyer defeated opponent Rupert Parchment, winning 55.24% of the votes cast. In the 2020 general election, Kirkmeyer defeated her Democratic Party opponent, winning 55.14% of the votes cast. She currently serves on the Senate Education, Local Government, Health and Human Services, and Statutory Revision Committees. She is also Vice Chair of the Legislative Interim Committee on School Finance.

2022 congressional campaign

On November 15, 2021, Kirkmeyer announced she was running to represent Colorado's new 8th congressional district. On June 28, 2022, she won the Republican primary and advanced to the November general election ultimately losing to Democratic opponent, Yadira Caraveo. During Kirkmeyer's campaign, she notably removed her stances on abortion from her website. She is one of Colorado's most anti-abortion lawmakers, supporting banning the procedure and some forms of contraception and celebrating the overturning of Roe v. Wade.

References

External links
Congressional campaign website
State senate campaign website
Legislative website

1958 births
21st-century American politicians
21st-century American women politicians
Candidates in the 2022 United States House of Representatives elections
Republican Party Colorado state senators
County commissioners in Colorado
Living people
People from Weld County, Colorado
University of Colorado Boulder alumni
Women state legislators in Colorado